The Dongyin Visitor Center is a visitor center in Lehua Village, Dongyin Township, Lienchiang County, Taiwan.

History
The center was constructed in 2003.

Architecture
The center is a 2-story building located on top of a hill. It has a bright orange roof. On the ground floor there is tourist information counter and a souvenir shop. On the upper floor there is an exhibition room.

Exhibitions
The center displays the ecological scenery of Dongyin which includes introductory video shows.

References

2003 establishments in Taiwan
Buildings and structures completed in 2003
Buildings and structures in Lienchiang County
Tourist attractions in Lienchiang County
Visitor centers in Taiwan